In Indian mathematics, a Vedic square is a variation on a typical 9 × 9 multiplication table where the entry in each cell is the digital root of the product of the column and row headings i.e. the remainder when the product of the row and column headings is divided by 9 (with remainder 0 represented by 9). Numerous geometric patterns and symmetries can be observed in a Vedic square, some of which can be found in traditional Islamic art.

Algebraic properties
The Vedic Square can be viewed as the multiplication table of the monoid  where  is the set of positive integers partitioned by the residue classes modulo nine. (the operator  refers to the abstract "multiplication" between the elements of this monoid).

This does not form a group because not every non-zero element has a corresponding inverse element;  for example  but there is no  such that .

Properties of subsets

The subset  forms a cyclic group with 2 as one choice of generator - this is the group of multiplicative units in the ring . Every column and row includes all six numbers - so this subset forms a Latin square.

From two dimensions to three dimensions 

A Vedic cube is defined as the layout of each digital root in a three-dimensional multiplication table.

Vedic squares in a higher radix 

Vedic squares with a higher radix (or number base) can be calculated to analyse the symmetric patterns that arise. Using the calculation above, . The images in this section are color-coded so that the digital root of 1 is dark and the digital root of (base-1) is light.

See also
 Latin square
 Modular arithmetic
 Monoid

References

 
 
 
 
 

Indian mathematics
Modular arithmetic